Barbara Clara Pereira, a native of Monagas, Venezuela, was crowned "Miss Italia Nel Mondo" 2000.

References

Living people
Year of birth missing (living people)
People from Monagas
Venezuelan people of Italian descent
Miss Italia nel Mondo winners